Wallace-McGee House is a historic home located at Columbia, South Carolina. It built in 1937, and is a two-story International style stuccoed house.  It features large areas of glass, a flat roof and a steel and reinforced concrete structural system. The front façade features a two-car garage topped by a sun deck. The house is based on plans by Edward Durell Stone published in Collier's Magazine on March 28, 1936.

It was added to the National Register of Historic Places in 1979.

References

Houses on the National Register of Historic Places in South Carolina
International style architecture in South Carolina
Houses completed in 1937
Houses in Columbia, South Carolina
National Register of Historic Places in Columbia, South Carolina